Sande is a municipality in Møre og Romsdal county, Norway. It is part of the Sunnmøre region. The administrative centre is the village of Larsnes on the island of Gurskøya. Other villages in Sande include Gursken, Sandshamn, Bringsinghaug, and Voksa.

The  municipality is the 331st largest by area out of the 356 municipalities in Norway. Sande is the 259th most populous municipality in Norway with a population of 2,422.

General information
Sande was established as a municipality on 1 January 1867 when it was separated from the large Herøy Municipality. The initial population was 2,493. On 1 January 1873, a part of eastern Sande (with 362 residents) was transferred back to Herøy. On 1 January 1889, the Eksund area and the island of Ekø (population: 119) were transferred to Herøy Municipality.

On 1 January 1905, the eastern district of Sande was separated to form the separate municipality of Rovde. This left Sande with 2,221 residents. During the 1960s, there were many municipal mergers across Norway due to the work of the Schei Committee. On 1 January 1964, the northern part of the municipality of Rovde (population: 562) plus three farms in the Gurskedalen valley (population: 25) were merged back with Sande (the southern part of Rovde was merged with Vanylven Municipality). The new Sande municipality had a population of 3,465. On 1 January 2002, the Åram area (population: 380) on the mainland was transferred from Sande to Vanylven Municipality.

Name
The municipality (originally the parish) is named after the old Sande farm, since the first Sande Church was built there. The name is identical with the word sandr which means "sand" or "sandy beach". Before 1892, the name was written Sandø.

Coat of arms
The coat of arms was granted on 23 October 1987. The arms show a white or silver line buoy on a blue background. This symbol was chosen since it was historically used by fishermen in ocean and fjords around the island municipality.

Churches
The Church of Norway has two parishes within the municipality of Sande. It is part of the Søre Sunnmøre prosti (deanery) in the Diocese of Møre.

Geography
Sande is composed of many islands including Sandsøya, Kvamsøya, Voksa, Riste, and part of Gurskøya (which is shared with neighboring Herøy). The island municipality sits north of the Rovdefjorden and east of the Vanylvsfjorden. The Haugsholmen Lighthouse sits in the southwest part of the municipality.

Government
All municipalities in Norway, including Sande, are responsible for primary education (through 10th grade), outpatient health services, senior citizen services, unemployment and other social services, zoning, economic development, and municipal roads. The municipality is governed by a municipal council of elected representatives, which in turn elect a mayor.  The municipality falls under the Møre og Romsdal District Court and the Frostating Court of Appeal.

Municipal council
The municipal council of Sande is made up of 21 representatives that are elected to four year terms. The party breakdown of the council is as follows:

Mayor
The mayors of Sande (incomplete list):
2019–present: Olav Myklebust (Sp)
2007-2019: Dag Vaagen (H)
2003-2007: Jon Garen (Sp)
1988-2003: Arne Dyrhol (H)
1984-1987: John Gjerde (V)
1982-1983: Jon Martin Bringsvor (H)

Famous residents
 Ingolf Rogde (1911 in Haugsholmen, Sande – 1978) a Norwegian actor with the touring theatre Riksteatret
 Bjartmar Gjerde, (1931 in Larsnes, Sande – 2009) a politician, Govt. minister & DG of the Norwegian Broadcasting Corporation
 Odd S. Lovoll (born 1934 in Sande) a Norwegian-American author, historian, educator and academic
 Morten Schakenda (born 1966 in Gjerdsvika, Sande) a Norwegian cook, and leading chef
 Jan Åge Fjørtoft, (born 1967 in Gursken, Sande) a former footballer with 497 club caps and 71 for Norway

Gallery

References

External links
Municipal fact sheet from Statistics Norway 

 
Municipalities of Møre og Romsdal
1867 establishments in Norway